Darko Tuševljaković (born 1978) is a Serbian writer. He was born in Zenica in the then-Yugoslavia (currently Bosnia and Herzegovina). The author of six books, he is best known for his 2016 novel Jaz (The Chasm) which won the European Union Prize for Literature in 2017. It was also shortlisted for Serbia's leading literary prize, the NIN Award. He published his most recent novel, Uzvišenost (Sublimeness), in 2021. 

Tuševljaković lives in Belgrade.

References

1978 births
Living people
People from Zenica
Writers from Belgrade